The 17th Congress of the Philippines, composed of the Philippine Senate and House of Representatives, met from July 25, 2016, until June 4, 2019, during the first three years of Rodrigo Duterte's presidency. The convening of the 17th Congress followed the 2016 general elections, which replaced half of the Senate membership and the entire membership of the House of Representatives.

Leadership

Senate 
 Senate President:
 Koko Pimentel (PDP–Laban), July 25, 2016 – May 21, 2018
 Tito Sotto (NPC), May 21, 2018 – June 4, 2019
 Senate President pro tempore:
 Franklin Drilon (Liberal), July 25, 2016 – February 27, 2017
 Ralph Recto (Nacionalista), February 27, 2017 – June 4, 2019
 Majority Floor Leader:
  Tito Sotto (NPC), July 25, 2016 – May 21, 2018
  Migz Zubiri (Independent), May 21, 2018 – June 4, 2019
 Minority Floor Leader:
 Ralph Recto (Liberal), July 25, 2016 – February 27, 2017
 Franklin Drilon (Liberal), February 28, 2017 – June 4, 2019

House of Representatives 
 Speaker: 
 Pantaleon Alvarez (Davao del Norte–1st, PDP–Laban), July 25, 2016 – July 23, 2018
 Gloria Macapagal Arroyo (Pampanga–2nd, PDP–Laban), July 23, 2018 – June 4, 2019
 Deputy Speakers:
 Eric Singson (Ilocos Sur–2nd, PDP–Laban), July 25, 2016 – August 29, 2018
 Mercedes Alvarez (Negros Occidental–6th, NPC), July 25, 2016 – June 4, 2019
 Fredenil Castro (Capiz–2nd, NUP), July 25, 2016 – January 21, 2019
 Raneo Abu (Batangas–2nd, Nacionalista), July 25, 2016 – June 4, 2019
 Miro Quimbo (Marikina–2nd, Liberal), July 25, 2016 – July 25, 2018 
 Gloria Macapagal Arroyo (Pampanga–2nd, Lakas–CMD), August 15, 2016 – March 15, 2017
 Pia Cayetano (Taguig–2nd, Nacionalista), August 15, 2016 – June 4, 2019
 Gwendolyn Garcia (Cebu–3rd, PDP–Laban), August 15, 2016 – August 15, 2018
 Mylene Garcia-Albano (Davao City–2nd, PDP–Laban), August 15, 2016 – June 4, 2019
 Sharon Garin (AAMBIS-OWA), August 15, 2016 – June 4, 2019
 Bai Sandra A. Sema (Maguindanao and Cotabato City-1st, PDP–Laban), August 15, 2016 – June 4, 2019 
 Ferdinand L. Hernandez (South Cotabato-2nd, NPC), August 16, 2016 – June 4, 2019 
 Frederick Abueg (Palawan-2nd, Liberal), August 16, 2016 – June 4, 2019 
 Rolando Andaya Jr. (Camarines Sur-1st, PDP–Laban), August 16, 2016 – July 30, 2018
 Linabelle Villarica (Bulacan-4th, Liberal), August 9, 2017 – June 4, 2019 
 Prospero Pichay Jr. (Surigao del Sur–1st, Lakas–CMD), August 15, 2018 – June 4, 2019 
 Arthur C. Yap (Bohol–3rd, PDP–Laban), August 15, 2018 – June 4, 2019 
 Rosemarie Arenas (Pangasinan–3rd, PDP–Laban), August 29, 2018 – present 
 Evelina Escudero (Sorsogon-1st, NPC), August 29, 2018 – June 4, 2019
 Randolph Ting (Cagayan–3rd, NUP), January 21, 2019 – June 4, 2019
 Majority Leader:
 Rodolfo Fariñas (Ilocos Norte–1st, PDP–Laban), July 25, 2016 – July 23, 2018
 Fredenil Castro (Capiz–2nd, NUP), interim, July 23, 2018 – July 30, 2018, January 21, 2019  – June 4, 2019
 Rolando Andaya Jr. (Camarines Sur-1st, PDP–Laban), July 30, 2018 – January 21, 2019
 Minority Leader: 
 Danilo Suarez (Quezon–3rd, Lakas–CMD), July 27, 2016 – June 4, 2019

Sessions 

 First regular session: July 25, 2016 – May 31, 2017
 Second regular session: July 24, 2017 – May 30, 2018
 Third regular session: July 23, 2018 – May 27, 2019

Composition 

Both chambers of Congress are divided into parties and blocs. While members are elected via parties, blocs are the basis for committee memberships. Only members of the majority and minority blocs are accorded committee memberships. This is how blocs are determined:
 Majority bloc: All members who voted for the Senate President or Speaker during the Senate presidential or speakership election.
 Minority bloc: All members who voted for the second-placed candidate during the Senate presidential or speakership election.
 Independent minority bloc: All members who did not vote for the winning or second-best nominee during the Senate presidential or speakership election.
 Independent bloc: All members who abstained from voting during the Senate presidential or speakership election.
 Not a member of any bloc: All members who have not voted during the Senate presidential or speakership election.

In the speakership election, several members abstained from voting. They, along with the members who voted for the losing candidate voted on who would be the minority leader.

Senate

House of Representatives

Membership

Senate 
The Senate of the 17th Congress were represented by 2 senators from Central Luzon region, 12 senators from Metro Manila region, 3 senators from Calabarzon region, 2 senators from Bicol Region, 1 senator from Western Visayas region, 2 senators from Northern Mindanao region, and 1 senator from Soccsksargen region. 10 regions in the Philippines have no representation in the Senate of the 17th Congress, while Metro Manila is represented by 12, half of all the senators. 

Notes

House of Representatives

District representatives

Notes
 Died on June 30, 2016, before taking office.
 Resigned after being appointed as Secretary of Public Works and Highways on August 1, 2016.
 Died on November 11, 2016.
 Died on June 3, 2017.
 Died on October 8, 2017.
 Left office on November 5, 2018, after appointment as Cabinet Secretary.

Party-list representatives

 Resigned on October 2, 2017.
 Resigned on October 30, 2017 after being appointed as presidential spokesperson.
 Resigned on July 11, 2018 after being appointed as Justice undersecretary.
 Died on September 23, 2018.
 Resigned on November 21, 2018
 Died on December 22, 2018

Committees

Constitutional bodies
*Originally Koko Pimentel (PDP–Laban) from July 25, 2016, to May 21, 2018.

Senate committees

*more popularly known as the Blue Ribbon Committee.

House of Representatives committees

Changes in membership

Senate

House of Representatives

District Representatives

Party-list Representatives

Laws passed 
The 17th Congress passed a total of 379 bills which were signed into law by President Rodrigo Duterte. 120 of these laws were national in scope, while 259 were local. Some of these laws include:

 Republic Act 10923: Postponing of the Philippine barangay and Sangguniang Kabataan elections, 2016
 Republic Act 10931: Universal Access to Quality Tertiary Education Act
 Republic Act 10952: Postponing of the Philippine barangay and Sangguniang Kabataan elections, 2016
 Republic Act 10962: Gift Check Act of 2017
 Republic Act 10966: Making December 8 as a nonworking holiday commemorating the feast of the Immaculate Conception
 Republic Act 11014: The First Philippine Republic Day Act
 Republic Act 11053: Anti-Hazing Act of 2018
 Republic Act 11054: Bangsamoro Organic Law
 Republic Act 11055: Philippine Identification System Act
 Republic Act 11058: Occupational Safety and Health Standards Law

References

Congresses of the Philippines
Fifth Philippine Republic